Jason Kevin Doyle (born 6 October 1985) is an Australian motorcycle speedway rider. He became World Champion in 2017 after winning the 2017 Speedway Grand Prix. 

Doyle is a member of the Australia national speedway team and represented his country in the Speedway World Cup and was a part of the Australian team that won the 2022 Speedway of Nations.

Career

UK and Europe
Born in Newcastle, New South Wales, Doyle made his British speedway debut in March 2005 for Premier League team the Isle of Wight Islanders. In 2006, Doyle remained with the Isle of Wight and signed for the Poole Pirates as their number 8 before moving up to the Elite League full-time with Poole in 2007. He moved to Premier League team the Somerset Rebels in 2008 after failing to secure a team place at Poole, although he still remained a Poole asset. During the 2008 season Doyle finished as runner up in the Premier League Pairs Championship with Emil Kramer and represented Australia at Under-23 Test level. He also won the Premier League Knockout Cup with Somerset.

Doyle missed the 2009 season after tearing the rotator cuff in his shoulder, but returned in 2010 for the Poole Pirates. In 2012 Doyle led the Rebels to League Cup victory and the team narrowly missed on winning the Premier League; He was voted Rider of the Year by the club's supporters.

In the 2013 season Doyle signed for the Birmingham Brummies, who reached the Elite League play-off final, losing to Poole Pirates. He also led the Somerset Rebels to the Premier League title. In December 2013 he signed for Leicester Lions for the 2014 season. Doyle fell foul of work permit rules and was initially denied a visa that would allow him to ride in the UK in 2014; The situation was resolved before the start of the 2014 season although he was only permitted to ride in one league, so was released by Somerset. He stayed with Lions in 2015 before returning to parent club Swindon Robins for 2016.

In 2013, Doyle won the Master of Speedway title in Bockhorn, Germany. Doyle has also raced in Poland and Sweden. In Sweden Doyle moved from Vastervik to Dakarna while in Poland he has left Lodz to join Torun. In 2015 he was the UK League Riders' Championship winner, a feat he repeated in 2018.

Doyle returned to Swindon Robins for the 2019 season, going on to win the SGB Premiership and KO Cup. In 2022, he signed for the Ipswich Witches for the SGB Premiership 2022 season and won the Premiership pairs and was the stand out rider in the league, finishing top of the league averages.

In 2023, he remained with Ipswich for the SGB Premiership 2023.

Australia
Doyle narrowly missed winning his first Australian Championship when he finished only 2 points behind Chris Holder over the three rounds of the 2014 Championship. In the "A" Final of the last round at the Gillman Speedway in Adelaide, Doyle fell and was excluded from the re-run and with Holder finishing second he was able to win his 5th national crown. Going into the round Doyle and Holder had been tied on 38 points after the first two rounds with Doyle winning the opening round in Kurri Kurri and Holder the second round at Undera Park.

On 28 December 2014 Doyle won the 2014/15 South Australian Championship at Gillman defeating Rohan Tungate, Justin Sedgmen and Dakota North in the final. Doyle became the first rider from NSW to win the SA title since Aub Lawson won the 3-Lap Championship in 1949. Doyle's win also makes it 8 SA Championships in succession not won by a South Australian rider.

On 10 January 2015 Doyle won the final round of the 2015 Australian Individual Speedway Championship at Kurri Kurri, to become Australian Champion.

International
Doyle has represented the Australian team at the Speedway World Cup, finishing 3rd with the team in 2013 in the Czech Republic and again in 2014 in Poland. Many judges believed he came of age in the 2014 Final at the Polonia Bydgoszcz Stadium, winning four of his six rides (including a win over reigning World Champion Tai Woffinden) and being the second highest scorer on the night with 13 behind Denmark's triple World Champion Nicki Pedersen who scored 17.

With his second Place at the 2014 Speedway Grand Prix Challenge on 20 September in Lonigo, Italy, Doyle qualified for the 2015 Speedway Grand Prix World Championship Series, joining Australian teammates Chris Holder (the 2012 World Champion) and Wild Card rider Troy Batchelor in the Speedway Grand Prix. Doyle had a mixed year in 2015, finishing the series in 5th spot with a best finish of 2nd in the penultimate round of Poland III. He finished off the year qualifying for the final at home in Australia, but a crash in the first turn with American Greg Hancock resulted in a short stay in hospital after suffering neck and chest injuries.

On 25 June 2016, Doyle won his first ever SGP when he took out the Speedway Grand Prix of Czech Republic at the Markéta Stadium in Prague. After finishing in 6th place in the next round in Britain he returned to the podium with second in Sweden before winning the next three Grand Prix in Poland II, Germany and Scandinavia to be in 1st place, 5 points ahead of three-time champion Greg Hancock after 9 of the 11 rounds. Doyle's 3 SGP wins in a row was the first time a rider had taken a hat-trick since fellow Aussie Jason Crump had won 3 in a row on his way to winning the 2016 championship but a crash in his first ride at the 3rd Polish round in which he dislocated his shoulder and broke his elbow put paid to his 2016 championship hopes.
His 2017 GP campaign was exemplary with his only single figure score having happened in Stockholm, he clinched the 2017 title after winning the Australian Grand Prix having dropped only 2 points for the whole meeting.

Doyle became world champion in 2017, dominating the Speedway Grand Prix series despite riding with a broken foot for much of the season, winning the Czech Republic and Australian stages.

Doyle finished in 10th place during the 2022 Speedway World Championship, after securing 83 points during the 2022 Speedway Grand Prix. However, the highlight of his season was winning the 2022 Speedway of Nations for Australia with Jack Holder and Max Fricke. He was later selected as a full time rider for the 2023 Speedway Grand Prix.

Major results

World individual Championship
2015 Speedway Grand Prix - 5th 
2016 Speedway Grand Prix - 5th (including Czech Republic, Gorzów, German and Swedish grand prix wins)
2017 Speedway Grand Prix - Champion (including Czech Republic and Australian grand prix wins)
2018 Speedway Grand Prix - 7th 
2019 Speedway Grand Prix - 7th 
2020 Speedway Grand Prix - 6th 
2021 Speedway Grand Prix - 9th 
2022 Speedway Grand Prix - 10th

World Team Championship
2013 Speedway World Cup – 3rd
2014 Speedway World Cup – 3rd
2015 Speedway World Cup – 4th
2016 Speedway World Cup – 4th
2017 Speedway World Cup - 5th
2018 Speedway of Nations - 4th
2019 Speedway of Nations - 3rd
2020 Speedway of Nations - 5th
2021 Speedway of Nations - 4th
2022 Speedway of Nations - Winner

References

1985 births
Living people
Australian speedway riders
Australian motorcycle racers
Ipswich Witches riders
Isle of Wight Islanders riders
Leicester Lions riders
Poole Pirates riders
Somerset Rebels riders
Swindon Robins riders
Individual Speedway World Champions
People from the Hunter Region
Sportspeople from Newcastle, New South Wales